Boskednan is a hamlet near Mulfra Hill northwest of Penzance in west Cornwall, England, United Kingdom. It is in the civil parish of Madron

See also

 Boskednan stone circle

References

External links

Hamlets in Cornwall
Penwith

ru:Боскеднан